Malcolm 'Mackie' Ralph Hobson (born 5 June 1966 in Graaff Reinet, Cape Province) is a South African cricketer. Hobson was a right-handed batsman who bowled right-arm fast-medium.

External links
Mackie Hobson at Cricinfo
Mackie Hobson at CricketArchive

1966 births
Living people
South African cricketers
KwaZulu-Natal cricketers
Eastern Province cricketers
Border cricketers
Gauteng cricketers
Northerns cricketers
Hampshire Cricket Board cricketers